The following is a list of video games developed and published by Konami, based on Kazuki Takahashi's Yu-Gi-Oh! manga and anime franchise, along with its spin-off series. With some exceptions, the majority of the games follow the card battle gameplay of the real-life Yu-Gi-Oh! Trading Card Game. There are 56 in total.

Platforms: Game Boy, Game Boy Color, Game Boy Advance, GameCube, Mobile, Nintendo DS, Nintendo 3DS, Nintendo Switch, PC, PlayStation, PlayStation 2, PlayStation 3, PlayStation 4, PlayStation 5, PSP, Wii, Xbox, Xbox 360, Xbox One, Xbox Series X/S.

Games

Notes

References

External links
  by Konami
  by Konami 

Konami franchises
Konami games
Shueisha franchises
 
Video game franchises
Lists of video games by franchise